Daffy Duck in Hollywood is a 1938 Warner Bros. Merrie Melodies animated short directed by Tex Avery. The cartoon was released on December 12, 1938, and stars Daffy Duck. The short is Avery's last Daffy Duck cartoon.

Plot
At Wonder Studios ("If it's a good picture, it's a Wonder"), producer I.M. Stupendous is interrupted in his office by Daffy, who asks for an acting position. The producer quickly responds "No!" and breaks the fourth wall by stating, "Y'know, that duck's screwy!" The phone rings and Daffy pops out of it, saying "You're correct, absolutely correct!", pinching Stupendous's nose. Stupendous then phones Director von Hamburger (a parody of Josef von Sternberg) and orders him to finish the picture he's working on that day.

On the set, all the crew rushes to follow Hamburger's order for a close-up while he starts smoking a cigarette. Daffy then swipes and starts smoking the cigarette, spelling out Warner Bros. with the smoke ("Just givin' my bosses a plug", he tells the audience. "I've got an option coming up!"). Hamburger asks how the sound is, and Daffy whistles into the microphone, getting a bad reaction from the crew member checking it. The director orders the lights turned on, but Daffy has connected the emergency fire hose to them, so water gushes out of the lights and down on the set where the actors are. Hamburger quotes "It's ruined, cut!" Daffy then plants bullets in the camera. When the camera rolls on Hamburger's orders, it starts shooting bullets. Hamburger begins crying while stating "This isn't a gangster picture!" Daffy sympathetically gives him a gift, promises to stop being screwy, and walks away. However, Daffy then pops up out of the gift box, bites Hamburger's nose and starts jumping around.

As filming begins, a typical romantic scene between a rooster and hen plays out. When the inevitable kiss comes up, Daffy jumps in and kisses the hen; he is so excited that he does it again. Hamburger declares "It's ruined, cut!" The time being noon, Hamburger asks for lunch: turkey with all the trimmings. However, Daffy is under the platter and bites Hamburger's nose again before jumping away. Then, in the film room, Daffy begins clipping and pasting together random film clips.

Hamburger tells Stupendous that his film is finished, Stupendous quotes "Well it better be good" as Daffy swaps out the films. Hamburger shows the "film". At first the title card reads "Gold Is Where You Find It" (a movie produced by Warner Bros. the same year), showing film clips of gold mining, but then it suddenly plays humorous live action clips of random scenes with appropriate mismatched audio (a lion roaring in Central Park Zoo, a US military parade, square dancing, the World Championship Fight in Madison Round Garden, and a beauty contest). Despite Hamburger's obvious (and justified) fear, Stupendous approves highly of the film as he finds that Hamburger has fainted.

As a result, Daffy is now the director, uttering the same line asking for turkey at lunchtime as Hamburger complete with Hamburger's accent and clothing. Hamburger is now the screwball, hiding under the platter, biting Daffy's nose, then jumping away as Daffy did earlier.

Home media
VHS - Daffy!
VHS - The Golden Age of Looney Tunes - Vol. 9: Hooray For Hollywood
VHS - Looney Tunes: The Collector's Edition - Vol. 8: Tex-Book Looney
LaserDisc - Daffy! and Porky!
LaserDisc - The Golden Age of Looney Tunes - Vol. 1
DVD - Looney Tunes Golden Collection: Volume 3

Notes
This cartoon has a special ending rendition of Merrily We Roll Along with a rather strange zoom-in sound-effect. Both American and European Turner "dubbed" version prints keep this special ending music.

References

External links

1938 animated films
1938 short films
1930s color films
Merrie Melodies short films
Films directed by Tex Avery
Films about Hollywood, Los Angeles
Films set in studio lots
Animated films set in Los Angeles
1938 films
Vitaphone short films
Daffy Duck films
Films about pigs
Short films with live action and animation
1930s Warner Bros. animated short films